Charles Archibald Chubb, 2nd Baron Hayter (11 November 1871 – 3 March 1967), was a British businessman.

Chubb was the son of George Chubb, 1st Baron Hayter (1848–1946), and the great-grandson of Charles Chubb (1772–1845), who had founded Chubb and Sons Lock and Safe Co.

Business career
He was a director of the family firm and its managing director from 1898 until 1948, his cousin Harry Emory Chubb became the chairman soon after. He was president of the Planet Building Society (later Magnet & Planet B.S.) and was a senior member of the Court of Common Council, City of London.

Personal life
Chubb was educated at The Leys School, Cambridge. He married Mary Haworth, daughter of John Fletcher Haworth JP, on 8 June 1898. They had three children, Shirley Chubb (1909–2002), George Charles Hayter Chubb (25 April 1911 – 2 September 2003), and Hon. David William Early Chubb (31 May 1914 – 4 March 1993). She died 4 June 1948. He succeeded to the titles in the baronetcy and the barony on the death of his father on 7 November 1946. He then married (Margaret) Alison, daughter of John Gimson Pickard, on 23 March 1949. He died on 3 March 1967, aged 95, and was succeeded in his titles by his son George Charles Hayter Chubb.

Arms

Notes

References
 Kidd, Charles, Williamson, David (editors). Debrett's Peerage and Baronetage (1990 edition). New York: St Martin's Press, 1990

1871 births
1967 deaths
People educated at The Leys School
Barons in the Peerage of the United Kingdom
English businesspeople